Virginia Driving Hawk Sneve  (born February 21, 1933) is a Native American author, with a focus on children's books about Native Americans.

Background and family
The daughter of James Driving Hawk, an Episcopalian priest, and Rose Driving Hawk (née Ross), Virginia was raised on the Rosebud Indian Reservation. She graduated from St. Mary's School for Indian Girls in Springfield, South Dakota and received her bachelor's and master's degrees from South Dakota State University (Brookings) where she met her husband.  She has published over twenty books on South Dakota history, aboriginal American history, poetry, fiction, and non-fiction works for children, as well as one about her female ancestors, "Completing the Circle".

Virginia is a member of the Rosebud Sioux Tribe (Sicangu Lakota). She studied journalism at the South Dakota State University. She is the mother of three, grandmother of five, and great-grandmother of two.

Career
It is because of her children that she realized the need for children's books about aboriginal Americans in a contemporary context rather than a "savage" myth of the past. Her husband is from a Norwegian family, so she wrote The Trickster and the Troll to bring together the two cultures of her children, for them and for her grandchildren.  The story follows the Lakota trickster Iktomi and a Norwegian house troll across the plains as they search for the troll's lost family.

Sneve was an English language teacher and counselor in several public schools, editor at the Brevet Press in Sioux Falls, South Dakota, and she has been a member of several organizations. She and her husband also ran an antiques business before retiring. She still writes today; her latest book is "The Christmas Coat: Memories of My Sioux Childhood", published in 2011 and named in the Smithsonian magazine's Best Children's Books of 2011. She still resides in South Dakota with her husband.

Works
That They May Have Life, The Episcopal Church in South Dakota 1850-1976 (1977)
The Twelve Moons" (Houghton Mifflin Reading Series) (1977)South Dakota Geographic Names, Sioux Falls, South Dakota: Brevet Press (1973)Betrayed (1974)When Thunders Spoke (1974) illustrated by Oren LyonsDancing Teepees: Poems of American Indian Youth (1989)The Chichi Hoohoo Bogeyman (1993)Completing the Circle (1995)The Hopis: A First Americans Book (1995) illustrated by Ronald HimlerThe Cherokees (1996)The Cheyennes (1996)The Apaches (1997)Grandpa Was a Cowboy and an Indian & Other Stories (2000)Lana's Lakota Moons (2007)The Christmas Coat: Memories of My Sioux Childhood (2011) illustrated by Ellen BeierThe Medicine Bag (1975)Jimmy Yellow Hawk'' (1972) illustrated by Oren Lyons

Prizes

National Humanities Medal, 2000
Human Rights Award, South Dakota State Counselors Association, 1996
Author-Illustrator Human and Civil Rights Award, 1996
Spirit of Crazy Horse Award, 1996
South Dakota Education Association Human Services Award, 1994
North American Indian Prose Award, University of Nebraska Press, 1992
Woman of Achievement, National Federation of Press Women, 1975

References

External links 
 Biography

1933 births
Living people
Native American writers
American women children's writers
Writers from South Dakota
Rosebud Sioux people
National Humanities Medal recipients
American children's writers
20th-century American writers
20th-century American women writers
21st-century American writers
21st-century American women writers
South Dakota State University alumni
20th-century Native American women
20th-century Native Americans
21st-century Native American women
21st-century Native Americans
Native American women writers